The following is a discography of the band Soulfarm.

Albums

As Inasense

As Soulfarm

As Lanzbom Solomon
C Lanzbom and Noah Solomon have also released a series of albums as a duo.

Singles

Music videos

Compilation appearances

Discographies of American artists